The SS Puerto Rican, was an American-flagged tanker disabled by an explosion on October 31, 1984. In addition to the cargo the ship was fueled with 8,500 barrels of Heavy Fuel Oil (Bunker C) before departure.

The ship had departed just after midnight and was in the process of disembarking the pilot at 3:24 a.m. when an explosion occurred near the No. 6 center-independent tank blowing the pilot Captain James S. Nolan and two crew members into the water. The pilot boat San Francisco rescued the pilot and one of the two crew members.

The incident
The ship was eight miles off the Golden Gate bridge  on October 31, 1984, at 3:24 a.m., when she was torn by a very large double explosion just forward of her deck house. A 100-foot section of deck, the whole width of the vessel, was thrown up and then back down forward on the deck in front of it, as flames shot hundreds of feet in the air.

Loss of life, Coast Guard response, partial sinking
A bar pilot, the third mate, and a crew member were thrown into the sea.  The pilot boat San Francisco rescued the badly injured pilot and mate, but the crewman was lost.  As fire raged onboard, the Coast Guard towed the crippled ship further out to sea, to keep her from breaking up and dumping her cargo near San Francisco Bay. On November 1, a storm passed through the area, battering the Puerto Rican with 35-mile-per-hour winds and 16-foot-high seas. That evening, after 32 hours of effort, navy fireboats finally extinguished the fire.  On November 3, 30 miles southwest of the Golden Gate, she broke up, her stern section sinking to a depth of 1500 feet within the boundaries of the Gulf of the Greater Farallones National Marine Sanctuary. Over a million and a quarter gallons of refined petroleum products, about one-third of Puerto Rican's cargo, went into the water.

Suspicion of bombing and subsequent investigation
In the days after the explosion, there were intimations in the media of sabotage linked to a labor dispute. The vessel had been picketed in a Bay Area port and some of its crew harassed by maritime union pickets. The FBI intervened, but it was quickly determined that no point source explosion had occurred. Later it was found that the explosion probably resulted from holes in tank compartment bulkheads that allowed caustic soda to mix with zinc, forming deadly hydrogen gas that then exploded.  A Coast Guard board of investigation attributed this to the negligence of the ship's officers on the inbound voyage from Long Beach.  But no cause of the explosion could be established with certainty.

Oil spill impact
The environmental impact was significant. In addition to the initial spill, the sunken stern section continued to discharge heavy bunker oil – as much as 8,000 barrels – for months and possibly years afterwards.  An estimated 4,815 seabirds were killed by oiling as a result of this spill; another 1,368 were recovered.

References 

Tankers of the United States
Maritime incidents in 1984
Shipwrecks of the California coast
Oil spills in the United States
October 1984 events in the United States
November 1984 events in the United States
1971 ships